The FDH Bank Knockout Cup, also known as the Malawi FAM Cup is the national association football cup competition in Malawi, on a knock-out-basis.

383 teams participated in the 2009 edition of the Standard bank FAM Cup. It was the third time that Standard bank was the sponsor of the tournament.

List of winners

Stanbic/Standard Bank Knockout Cup

FISD Challenge Cup

FDH Bank Cup

References
Malawi - List of Cup Winners, rsssf.com

Football competitions in Malawi
National association football cups